Woodbridge is a semi-rural locality in the local government area (LGA) of Kingborough in the Hobart LGA region of Tasmania. The 2016 census has a population of 503 for the state suburb of Woodbridge.

History 
Aboriginal Tasmanians have held a strong significance for and connection to the area for as many as 40,000 years.

Woodbridge was gazetted as a locality in 1967.
Originally named Peppermint Bay, it is located on the D'Entrecasteaux Channel. First European settlement was in 1847. Peppermint Bay Post Office opened on 15 May 1854 and the town was renamed Woodbridge in 1881.

Geography
The shore of the D'Entrecasteaux Channel forms the eastern boundary.

Road infrastructure 
The Channel Highway (Route B68) passes through from north to south. Route C627 (Woodbridge Hill Road) starts at an intersection with B68 and runs west until it exits.

Notable residents
 Richard Deodatus Poulett-Harris - educationalist
 Lily Poulett-Harris - founder of women's cricket in Australia
 Henry Vere Poulett-Harris - Tasmanian and Western Australian state-level cricketer

References

External links
Woodbridge School

Towns in Tasmania
Southern Tasmania
Localities of Kingborough Council